The 2021 Kilkenny Intermediate Hurling Championship was the 57th staging of the Kilkenny Intermediate Hurling Championship since its establishment by the Kilkenny County Board in 1929. The championship began on 9 October 2021 and ended on 14 November 2021.

The final was played on 14 November 2021 at UPMC Nowlan Park in Kilkenny, between Glenmore and St. Lachtain's, in what was their first ever meeting in a final. Glenmore won the match by 3–19 to 2–09 to claim their second championship title overall and a first title in 40 years.

Paul Holden and Liam Hickey were the championship's top scorers.

Team changes

To Championship

Promoted from the Kilkenny Junior Hurling Championship
 Conahy Shamroks

Relegated from the Kilkenny Senior Hurling Championship
 Danesfort

From Championship

Promoted to the Kilkenny Senior Hurling Championship
 Lisdowney

Relegated to the Kilkenny Junior Hurling Championship
 St. Patrick's, Ballyragget

Fixtures/results

First round

Relegation playoffs

Quarter-finals

Semi-finals

Final

Championship statistics

Top scorers

Top scorers overall

In a single game

References

External links
 Kilkenny GAA website

Kilkenny Intermediate Hurling Championship
Kilkenny Intermediate Hurling Championship